Tarqi may refer to:

Tarki, Russia
Tarqi, North Khorasan, Iran
Tarqi, Razavi Khorasan, Iran